Ampang Medikal is a Malaysian based medical drama series. The brainchild of Abdul Rahman Ahmad (CEO of Media Prima Sdn Bhd) and Keith Chong (CEO of Niche Films Sdn Bhd), the series is a first in Malaysian TV for medical dramas, set in a fictional hospital in Ampang, Kuala Lumpur and also the first to feature an openly gay person character onscreen played by Kris Law . Production began on May 5, 2008 and the series debuted on NTV7 on August 21, 2008. The series has been compared to Grey's Anatomy.

Cast

References

Medical television series
Malaysian drama television series
2008 Malaysian television series debuts
2008 Malaysian television series endings
NTV7 original programming